Reginald Ruggles Gates (May 1, 1882 – August 12, 1962), was a Canadian-born geneticist who published widely in the fields of botany and eugenics.

Early life
Reginald Ruggles Gates was born on May 1, 1882, near Middleton, Nova Scotia, to a family of English ancestry. He had a twin sister named Charlotte.

Gates graduated with first class honours in science from Mount Allison University in 1903. Further studies toward a second B.Sc. from McGill University were interrupted by a year in which he returned to his childhood home in Middleton, Nova Scotia, where he served as vice-principal in a local school. He completed this second B.Sc. in 1905, focusing on botany, before accepting a Senior Fellowship at University of Chicago where he completed his Ph.D. on heredity in Oenothera lata (evening primrose) in 1908.

Career
Gates did botanical work in Missouri in 1910. Later, he was a lecturer at Bedford College, London and Professor of Biology at King's College London. He was known for his studies of Oenothera and other plants.

Gates was elected a Fellow of the Royal Society in 1931. His nomination reads

Additionally, Gates was a eugenicist. In 1923, he wrote Heredity and Eugenics. He maintained his ideas on race and eugenics long after World War II, into the era when these were deemed anachronistic. He was a founder of Mankind Quarterly and the International Association for the Advancement of Ethnology and Eugenics, his articles abounded in the journal as Acta Geneticae Medicae et Gemellologiae. He was a strong opponent of interracial marriage and, according to A.S. Winston, "argued that races were separate species."

Personal life
In 1911, Gates married Marie Stopes, but the marriage was annulled in 1914, with Stopes claiming the marriage had not been consummated. Gates did not contest the divorce, although he disputed Stopes's claims, describing her as "super-sexed to a degree that was almost pathological" and adding to this "I could have satisfied the desires of any normal woman".

Gates married Jennie Williams in 1929; the marriage was later dissolved. In 1955, he married Laura Greer.

Death and legacy

Gates died on August 12, 1962, and was buried in Brookwood Cemetery in Surrey, England. He is memorialized by the Ruggles Gates Award at Mount Allison University.

Selected publications

 Heredity and Eugenics. (1923). Constable & Co Limited. London, Sydney, Bombay.
 Heredity in Man. (1929). Constable & Company.
 A botanist in the Amazon Valley. (1927). H. F. & G. Witherby. 
 Human Genetics. (1946). The Macmillan company (2 volumes).
 Human Ancestry. (1948). Harvard University Press.
 "Racial elements in the aborigines of Queensland, Australia". (Jan. 1960). Zeitschrift für Morphologie und Anthropologie. Bd. 50. H. 2. pp. 150–166.

References

1882 births
1962 deaths
Mount Allison University alumni
Canadian eugenicists
Fellows of the Royal Society
McGill University alumni
Academics of King's College London
Burials at Brookwood Cemetery
Canadian emigrants to England
Canadian expatriates in the United States
University of Chicago staff